It's A Long Story: My Life is a 2015 autobiography by Country music singer-songwriter Willie Nelson co-authored with David Ritz.

Content
The book is the second autobiography written by Nelson, after the 1988 release of Willie: An Autobiography. In October 2013, Little, Brown and Company announced the publishing of the new book for 2015, calling it "an unvarnished story" of the singer.

Co-authored with David Ritz, the book was promoted as "the definitive autobiography of Willie Nelson".

Footnotes

References

2015 non-fiction books
Music autobiographies
Books by Willie Nelson
Collaborative autobiographies